The Smith-Moore House is a historic house at 901 North Main Street in Beebe, Arkansas.  It is a -story wood-frame structure, with a side gable roof, weatherboard exterior, and a foundation of brick piers.  Its front facade has three gabled wall dormers above its entry porch, and there is a carport extending to the right.  The house was built about 1880, and is one of the few houses in White County surviving from that period.

The house was listed on the National Register of Historic Places in 1992.  It was delisted in 2018.

See also
National Register of Historic Places listings in White County, Arkansas

References

Houses on the National Register of Historic Places in Arkansas
Houses completed in 1880
Houses in White County, Arkansas
National Register of Historic Places in White County, Arkansas
Buildings and structures in Beebe, Arkansas
Former National Register of Historic Places in Arkansas
1880 establishments in Arkansas